Xuxa só para Baixinhos 13 or ABC do XSPB (also known as XSPB 13) is the thirty-sixth studio album and the twenty-ninth in Portuguese of Brazilian singer and TV host Xuxa Meneghel, released on December 16, 2016, the album marks the return of the presenter to his former record company Som Livre. It's the thirteenth album in the collection Só Para Baixinhos.

Release and content
Xuxa só para Baixinhos 13 would be released two years earlier but its release date was postponed several times, for some press vehicles the delay occurred due to the singer's departure from his former television station Globo TV network, and also current owner of the singer's Som Livre. The fans of the singer even promoted campaigns for the launch of XSPB 13. From comments on the official site of the record company on Facebook, file complaints on the 'Claim Here' website and even fill in the email boxes of the record company team. The album had been nominated for the seventh time to the 17th Annual Latin Grammy Awards, but in order to compete and be considered for the prize, the DVD should have been released until October 31. The album was finally released on December 16, 2016, in CD and DVD format, without even a modification in the list of tracks of the two formats. The album marks the return of the presenter to his former record company Som Livre.

Xuxa só para Baixinhos 13 contains unpublished songs, the project teaches the alphabet in a light and fun way, allowing children to know more about each letter.

Track listing

References

External links 
 Xuxa só para Baixinhos 13 at Discogs

2016 albums
2016 video albums
Xuxa video albums
Xuxa albums
Children's music albums by Brazilian artists
Portuguese-language video albums
Portuguese-language albums
Som Livre albums